Chege is a surname of Kenyan origin that may refer to:

Laban Chege (born 1969), Kenyan long-distance runner
Lucy Chege (born 1976), Kenyan volleyball player
Sabina Wanjiru Chege (born 1972), Kenyan politician
Chege W. Chege (born 1989), Kenyan Linguist, Literature guru, and owner of Chania FM, Kenya

See also
Ndunyu Chege, Kenyan settlement

, Gerald Chege, Kenyan born Artist (1972)

References

Kenyan names